The 1931 World Table Tennis Championships men's singles was the fifth edition of the men's singles championship.

Miklós Szabados met compatriot Viktor Barna in the final of this event. Szabados won the final three sets to nil.

Draw

Finals

References

-